Russkaya Shveytsariya (Urıś Şveytsariyahı, lit. "Russian Switzerland") is a rural locality (a village) in Maxim-Gorkovsky Selsoviet, Belebeyevsky District, Bashkortostan, Russia. The population was 225 as of 2010. There are 4 streets.

Geography 
Russkaya Shveytsariya is located 22 km southeast of Belebey (the district's administrative centre) by road. Selo Tsentralnoy usadby plemzavoda imeni Maxima Gorkogo is the nearest rural locality.

References 

Rural localities in Belebeyevsky District